Haanstra is a surname, and may refer to:
 Bert Haanstra (1916 – 1997), Dutch film director
 John Haanstra (1926 – 1969), electrical engineer and a computer industry executive

Surnames of Dutch origin
Dutch-language surnames